George Lewis Ingalls (June 7, 1914 – April 10, 2001) was an American lawyer and politician from New York.

Life
He was born on June 7, 1914, in Danielson, Windham County, Connecticut, the son of Louis Sessions Ingalls and Mary Ethel (Gallup) Ingalls. He graduated from Amherst College in 1935; and from Syracuse University College of Law in 1939. He practiced law in Binghamton, New York. On December 12, 1942, he married Dorothy M. Joggerst, and they had four children.

Ingalls was a member of the New York State Assembly from 1953 to 1966, sitting in the 169th, 170th, 171st, 172nd, 173rd, 174th, 175th and 176th New York State Legislatures. He was Majority Leader from 1961 to 1964; and Minority Leader in 1965. On December 13, 1965, the Republican Assembly conference elected Perry B. Duryea, Jr. as Minority Leader, to replace Ingalls at the beginning of the session of 1966.

He was a Trustee of the New York Power Authority from 1967 to 1990.

He died on April 10, 2001, in Our Lady of Lourdes Hospital in Binghamton, New York; and was buried at the Calvary Cemetery in Johnson City.

Sources

1914 births
2001 deaths
People from Killingly, Connecticut
Republican Party members of the New York State Assembly
Politicians from Binghamton, New York
Amherst College alumni
Syracuse University College of Law alumni
20th-century American politicians
Lawyers from Binghamton, New York
20th-century American lawyers